Fuad Eduardo Chahin Valenzuela (born 1 December 1976) is a Chilean politician and lawyer. He served as Deputy for District 49 (Araucanía) from 2010 to 2014 and also 2014–2018. He was president of the Christian Democratic Party from 2018 to 2021.

Early life 
Chahin was born on December 1, 1976.

He is the grandson of a Palestinian immigrant and a Mapuche peasant.

References

External links

BCN Profile

1976 births
Living people
21st-century Chilean lawyers
21st-century Chilean politicians
University of Chile alumni
Christian Democratic Party (Chile) politicians
Members of the Chilean Constitutional Convention
People from Temuco